The Methodist Church of New Zealand is a Methodist denomination headquartered in Christchurch, New Zealand. It is a member of the World Methodist Council.

History

The Methodist movement was started by John Wesley, an 18th-century Church of England minister. Methodist missionaries were among the earliest Europeans to come to New Zealand. Missionaries Samuel Leigh and William White established the first Wesleyan mission, Wesleydale at Kaeo on the Whangaroa Harbour, on 6 June 1823. Leigh worked alongside Anglican missionary Samuel Marsden. In the late 19th and early 20th centuries the Methodist Church, with its emphasis on personal salvation and social responsibility, played an important part in the temperance movement and other moral debates.
Writer and social reformer Percy Paris became president of the Conference in 1938. The Annual Conference has always been the governing body of the Methodist Church of New Zealand.

Since the early 1900s the proportion of New Zealanders who are Methodist has declined from 10% to a reported 2.6% in the 2013 census. At the 1983 conference the church made a conscious decision to work towards inclusion of all ethnicities and cultures. The denomination is supportive of women ministers and clergy in same-sex relationships. In 1999 the conference decided to allow ministers to bless same-sex relationships. In 2013, when same-sex marriage was legalized in New Zealand congregations that opted to do so were able to perform same-sex marriage ceremonies.

The World Methodist Council website reports 9,473 Methodist Church members who worship as part of a Methodist Church parish; additionally, a "significant number" of Methodist members worship in churches co-operating with Anglicans and Presbyterians. This membership figure is undated.

Ecumenical relations 
The Methodist Church of New Zealand is a member of the World Council of Churches and the Christian Conference of Asia. Since 2016 the church has participated in an ecumenical platform, National Dialogue for Christian Unity (NDCU), along with Anglicans and Roman Catholics.

References

External links

Methodist Church – Te Ara Encyclopedia of New Zealand

Methodist denominations
Methodism in New Zealand
Members of the World Council of Churches
Organisations based in Christchurch
Religion in Christchurch